A coin was issued for circulation in Connaught during the reign of King Edward VI of England (1547–53). It is a contemporary forgery of the extremely rare English shilling of that reign. It was struck in brass, and, occasionally, in copper. This interesting coin was known by the nickname 'Bungal', whose origin is not yet known. It circulated as a 1 penny coin.

Obverse inscription

EDWARD VI D.G. AGL FRAN Z HB REX - Edward VI by the grace of God, of England, France and Ireland King.

Reverse inscription

TIMOR DOMINI FONS VITE MDLII - The fear of God is the fountain of life 1552. This was the family motto of Edmund Butler, 1st/11th Baron Dunboyne (1515–1567) and subsequent Barons Dunboyne.

Obverse details

The crowned portrait of the boy King facing right. The harp mintmark is located at the start of the inscription.

Reverse details

The English coat of arms in an oval shield dividing the letters 'E.R.'

Catalogue reference numbers

IE6SH-010.

S6494a

See also

Coins of Ireland

References

Coincraft's Standard Catalogue of the coins of Scotland, Ireland, Channel Islands & Isle of Man by Coincraft, 1999.

Connaught
1552 in Ireland